The 2021  Women's PSA World Series Finals is the third women's edition of the PSA World Tour Finals (Prize money : $185,000) after the renaming of PSA World Series. The top 8 players in the 2020–21 PSA World Tour are qualified for the event. The event takes place at Mall of Arabia, Cairo in Egypt from 22–27 June 2021.

It's the third edition under the PSA World Tour Finals label after the PSA renamed PSA World Series to current PSA World Tour Finals. CIB remains as the title sponsor.

Nouran Gohar, in her first World Tour Finals Final appearance, became champion after defeating defending champion Hania El Hammamy 11–9, 11–6, 8–11, 11–8.

PSA World Ranking Points
PSA also awards points towards World Ranking. Points are awarded as follows:

Match points distribution
Points towards the standings are awarded when the following scores:

Qualification & Seeds

Qualification
Top eight players at 2020–21 PSA World Tour standings qualifies to Finals.

Seeds

Group stage results
Times are Eastern European Time (UTC+02:00). To the best of three games.

Group A

Standings

Group B

Standings

Knockout stage

Semifinal
To the best of three games.

Final
To the best of five games.

See also
2021 Men's PSA World Tour Finals
2020–21 PSA World Tour
2020–21 PSA World Tour Finals

References

External links
PSA World Tour Finals at PSA website
PSA World Tour Finals official website

W
PSA World Tour Finals
PSA World Tour Finals